Gangs of the Waterfront is a 1945 American crime drama film directed by George Blair, and based on an original story by Samuel Fuller.  Robert Armstrong has a dual role as Dutch Malone, a gang leader, and a taxidermist Peter Winkly who is induced to take over the gang while Dutch is sidelined by an auto accident.

Cast

 Robert Armstrong as Peter Winkly / Dutch Malone
 Stephanie Bachelor as Jane Rodgers
 Martin Kosleck as Anjo Ferreati
 Marion Martin as Rita 
 William Forrest as Brady
 Wilton Graff as Police Commissioner 
 Eddie Hall as Miller 
 Jack O'Shea as Ortega
 Davison Clark as Dr. Martin
 Dick Elliott as Police Chief Davis
 unbilled players include Blake Edwards

References

External links
 

1945 films
Republic Pictures films
1945 drama films
Films directed by George Blair
American drama films
American black-and-white films
1940s American films
1940s English-language films